John Aiken (born 1950) is an Irish sculptor who is professor of fine arts and director of the Academy of Visual Arts at Hong Kong Baptist University. He was previously Slade Professor of Fine Arts and director of the Slade School of Fine Art at University College London from 2000 to 2012.

Early life
Aiken was born in Belfast, Northern Ireland, in 1950. He received his art training at the Chelsea School of Art (1968–1973) and was a Rome Scholar in Sculpture at the British School in Rome.

Career
He taught at the Art and Design Centre of the University of Ulster and was the Slade Professor of Fine Arts and director of the Slade School of Fine Art at University College London from 2000 to 2012. Since 2012 he has been professor of fine arts and director of the Academy of Visual Arts, Hong Kong Baptist University.

References

External links 
http://johnaiken.com/about/

Irish sculptors
Academic staff of Hong Kong Baptist University
Academics of Ulster University
Academics of University College London
Academics of the Slade School of Fine Art
Artists from Belfast
Alumni of Chelsea College of Arts
Living people
1950 births